The following comprise a list of Aboriginal schools  in South Australia.

Preschools and kindergartens
 Kalaya Children's Centre, Queenstown, South Australia
 Kaurna Plains, Elizabeth, South Australia
 Preschool School  
 Child Care

Schools
Amata Anangu School, Amata  
Carlton Primary School, Port Augusta 
Ernabella Anangu School, Pukatja
Fregon Anangu School, Kaltjiti 
Indulkana Anangu School, Iwantja
Kaurna Plains School, Elizabeth 
Kenmore Park Anangu School, Yunyarinyi  
Koonibba Aboriginal School, Koonibba  
Marree Aboriginal School, Marree  
Mimili Anangu School, Mimili 
Murputja Anangu School, Murputja  
Oak Valley Anunga School, Oak Valley 
Oodnadatta Aboriginal School,  Oodnadatta 
Pipalyatjara Anangu School, Pipalyatjara 
Point Pearce Aboriginal School, Point Pearce  
Raukkan Aboriginal School, Raukkan   
Yalata Anangu School, Yalata

See also
List of schools in South Australia
Anangu Schools

References

South Australia